The Trentino-Alto Adige/Südtirol regional election of 1960 took place on 6 November 1960.

Following inter-ethnic tensions, the German minority refused to join the administration, and the Christian Democracy formed a classic centrist majority with the Democratic Socialists and the Liberals.

Results

Regional Council

Source: Trentino-Alto Adige/Südtirol Region

Trentino

Source: Trentino-Alto Adige/Südtirol Region

South Tyrol

Source: Trentino-Alto Adige/Südtirol Region 

Elections in Trentino-Alto Adige/Südtirol
1960 elections in Italy